Jonte Willis (born October 18, 1983 in Memphis, Tennessee - death January 4, 2022 Tacoma, Washington) is a former American heavyweight boxer best known for winning the US amateur championships at super heavyweight in 2006. He retired with a negative record and health problems in 2014.

Background
Adopted at the age of four months by Weldon and Dorothy Willis of Memphis, Tennessee. He is the youngest of five brothers and five sisters. He is cousin of 49er and NFL pro-bowler Patrick Willis. Jonte was raised in  Bruceton, TN and attended Central’s junior and senior high school. In the eighth grade, he was chosen as captain of the junior high school football team. In his senior year at Central High School, he captained the Tiger football team.

In July, 2014 he was arrested  on charges of  domestic-violence assault and felony harassment to his son's mother. According to the victim's account, he had recently suffered from a head injury that resulted in strange behavior by Willis.

Amateur career

Willis started boxing in 2004.
He won the US national championship in March 2006, initially he was the runner-up losing in the final to Mike Wilson 23-12. However, Wilson failed a drug test, and Willis was awarded the championship.[2] He also had a 2nd place showing at the 2006 Police Athletic League National Championships where he lost against Michael Hunter, 8-10.[3]
Willis was KOd by Cuban's Olympic Champion Odlanier Solis Fonte in the 2006 World Cup tournament in October 2006 Baku. He outpointed Kazakh Alexander Makarov 18:7.[4]

He placed 2nd in the 2007 Pam Am Qualifier where he beat Hunter in a close fight 16-16(27-24) but could not compete against his old foe Mike Wilson due to illness.[5]
He won the 2007 Tacoma Golden Gloves where he beat Canada's #2 ranked superheavy weight Brandon Lowrie and continued on to the 2007 Nevada Golden Gloves where he won again against Michael Hunter. At the National Golden Gloves, however, he was KOd in the semi-finals by Tyler Turner.[6]

At the 2007 US Championships he lost his first bout against Kimdo Bethel 13-13 (25-27).[7]

Pro career
He turned pro in 2007 weighing 214 lbs and won his first 7 bouts but
after his first loss in 2011 only won two more fights and piled up 10 losses. 
Willis is currently suspended from boxing indefinitely.

External links

References

1. Charges: Boxer who choked girlfriend 'lost it' after head injury, Komonews July 24, 2014
2. Results US Championships 2006
3. Hollow Rock School, Willis bio
4. Baku 2006 results
5. 2007 results qualifier
6. Golden Gloves 2007
7. USA today June 4, 2007

1983 births
Living people
Boxers from Tennessee
Heavyweight boxers
Winners of the United States Championship for amateur boxers
Sportspeople from Memphis, Tennessee
American male boxers